Good News is a 1930 American pre-Code musical film directed by Nick Grinde, and starring Bessie Love, Cliff Edwards, and Penny Singleton. The film was shot in black-and-white, although the finale was in Multicolor.

The film is preserved at the UCLA Film and Television Archive. The surviving print lacks the color finale; no footage is known to survive.

The film was based on the 1927 stage production of the same name. Another film based on the musical, also called Good News, was released in 1947. By the 1940s, the 1930 production was not shown in the United States due to its Pre-Code content, which included sexual innuendo and lewd suggestive humor.

Plot 
College student Connie Lane (Lawlor) falls for campus football star Tom Marlowe (Smith), but his bad grades threaten to make him miss the big game. Professor Kenyon (McGlynn) helps Tom academically, and Tom is able to play in the big game and lead the team to victory.

Cast

Songs 
 "He's a Lady's Man" by Lew Brown, B.G. DeSylva, and Ray Henderson
 "The Best Things in Life Are Free" by Lew Brown, B.G. DeSylva, and Ray Henderson
 "Varsity Drag" by Lew Brown, B.G. DeSylva, and Ray Henderson
 "Good News" by Lew Brown, B.G. DeSylva, and Ray Henderson
 "Tait Song" by Lew Brown
 "Students Are We" by Lew Brown
 "If You're Not Kissing Me" by Arthur Freed and Nacio Herb Brown
 "Football" by Arthur Freed and Nacio Herb Brown
 "I Feel Pessimistic" by J. Russel Robinson and George Waggner
 "I'd Like to Make You Happy" by Reggie Montgomery

Reception 

Although it received mixed reviews – deemed "trivial and unreal" by one reviewer and "inferior to the stage production" by another – the cast received positive reviews, particularly Bessie Love.

See also 
 List of early color feature films
 List of incomplete or partially lost films

References

External links 
 
 
 
 
 Advertisement
 Photo

1930 films
1930 musical comedy films
1930s color films
American football films
American musical comedy films
American black-and-white films
1930s English-language films
Films based on musicals
Films directed by Nick Grinde
Films set in the 1920s
Films set in universities and colleges
Metro-Goldwyn-Mayer films
Transitional sound films
1930s American films